ACM SIGACCESS is the Association for Computing Machinery's Special Interest Group on Accessible computing, an interdisciplinary group of academic and industrial researchers, clinicians and rehabilitation personnel, policy makers, end users, and students to develop technologies for use by people with disabilities.

History
In 1964, the Association for Computing Machinery started a Committee on Professional Activities for the Blind, which published a newsletter for four years and organized a conference in 1969. The purpose of the committee was to promote and support blind people as capable programmers. The committee broadened its focus to include other people with disabilities and became the "Special Interest Group on Computers and the Physically Handicapped" (SIGCAPH) in 1971.
In 2003, the SIG was renamed to SIGACCESS.

Conferences
The ACM SIGACCESS Conference on Computers and Accessibility (ASSETS) is the flagship annual conference. All conference contributions are peer-reviewed by an international program committee, and accepted papers, posters and demonstrations are archived in the ACM Digital Library. All authors of accepted papers will be invited to submit extended versions of their papers to a special issue of the ACM Transactions on Accessible Computing (TACCESS).

SIGACCESS also sponsors other ACM workshops and conferences on a rotating basis.

Journal
Transactions on Accessible Computing is a quarterly ACM journal that publishes refereed articles about accessible computing. The journal places emphasis on contributions with experimental results, but also accepts papers with new theoretical insights or positions.

SIGACCESS also publishes the Accessibility and Computing newsletter.

Awards

ASSETS Paper Impact Award
The ASSETS Paper Impact Award is given to authors whose papers have made a significant impact on the field. Papers must be at least ten years old to be considered.

Outstanding Contribution to Computing and Accessibility Award
The Outstanding Contribution award is given in even-numbered years and recipients give a keynote presentation at the following ASSETS conference.

Previous recipients:
 2018 - Judy Brewer
 2016 - Richard E. Ladner
 2014 - Vicki L. Hanson
 2012 - John A. Gardner
 2010 - Albert M. Cook
 2008 - James Thatcher

References

Association for Computing Machinery Special Interest Groups
Computer accessibility
Assistive technology
Web accessibility